Captain Nemo (later identified as an Indian, Prince Dakkar) is a fictional character created by the French novelist Jules Verne (1828–1905). Nemo appears in two of Verne's science-fiction classics, Twenty Thousand Leagues Under the Seas (1870) and The Mysterious Island (1875). He also makes a brief appearance in a play written by Verne with the collaboration of Adolphe d'Ennery, Journey Through the Impossible (1882).

Nemo is a mysterious figure. Though originally of unknown nationality, he is later described as the son of an Indian raja. A scientific visionary, he roams the depths of the seas in his submarine, the Nautilus, which was assembled from parts manufactured in several different countries, then shipped to a cover address. The captain is consumed by a hunger for vengeance and hatred of imperialism; the British Empire is ultimately revealed as his main antagonist.

Nemo has appeared in various film adaptations of Verne's novels, where he has been portrayed by such celebrated actors as James Mason, Herbert Lom, Patrick Stewart, Naseeruddin Shah, Ben Cross, and Michael Caine. He has also been appropriated by other authors for their own novels, including Alan Moore and Kevin O'Neill's The League of Extraordinary Gentlemen, Philip José Farmer's The Other Log of Phileas Fogg, Kevin J. Anderson's Captain Nemo: The Fantastic History of a Dark Genius, Thomas F. Monteleone's The Secret Sea and Howard Rodman's The Great Eastern.

Etymology 
Nemo is Latin for 'no one' or 'nobody'. Nemo is itself the Latin translation of Ancient Greek Outis 'Nobody', the pseudonym adopted by the sea-faring hero Odysseus in Greek mythology to outwit the Cyclops Polyphemus. This appears to be the intended meaning, since in The Mysterious Island, when Cyrus Harding addresses him as Captain Nemo, the latter replies, "I have no name!"

Fictional character biography 

Chief among the few details of Nemo's history given in Twenty Thousand Leagues Under the Seas are his hatred of imperialism and his grief over the loss of his loved ones in years past.

In The Mysterious Island, Captain Nemo identifies himself as Prince Dakkar, son of the Hindu raja of Bundelkhand, and a descendant of the Muslim Sultan Fateh Ali Khan Tipu of the Kingdom of Mysore, famous for the Anglo-Mysore Wars (1767–1799) and Mysorean rocket technology. After the Indian Rebellion of 1857, in which Dakkar lost both his family and his kingdom, the prince devoted himself to scientific research, ultimately building the Nautilus and cruising the seven seas with a crew of devoted followers. They gather bullion from various shipwrecks in the ocean, most notably from the hulks of the Spanish treasure fleet sunk during the Battle of Vigo Bay. Nemo claims to have no interest in terrestrial affairs but occasionally intervenes to aid people in distress, e.g.,  by giving salvaged treasure to participants in the Cretan Revolt (1866–1869) against the island's Turkish rulers; by saving (both physically and financially) a Ceylonese or Tamil pearl diver from a shark attack; by rescuing the castaways in Twenty Thousand Leagues Under the Seas; and by covertly protecting another set of castaways in The Mysterious Island.

Like many actual Indian princes of the era, Nemo received a Western education, during which, as he states, he spent his youth touring and studying throughout Europe. In his first meeting with Professor Aronnax and his companions, the three castaways speak to him in French, English, Latin, and German; Nemo later reveals that he is fluent in all of these tongues. Aronnax praises the captain's French, noting that he "expressed himself with perfect ease and without any accent." Relying on his intuition and knowledge of ethnology, the professor concludes that "there's southern blood" in him but can't determine the captain's exact origin. The Nautilus library, lounge, and art collections reveal that Nemo is intimately acquainted with European culture, also that he's an accomplished performer on the organ.

Nemo dies of unspecified natural causes on board the Nautilus, docked permanently inside Dakkar Grotto on Lincoln Island in the South Pacific. Cyrus Harding, leader of the castaways whom Nemo protected, administered the last rites, then submerged the Nautilus in the grotto's waters. Shortly after, the volcanic island is destroyed when magma reaches the sea water in Dakkar Grotto, creating a massive steam explosion which blows the island and the Nautilus to pieces.

Character 

Nemo's characteristics are largely presented through the observations of Professor Pierre Aronnax, narrator of Twenty Thousand Leagues Under the Seas. At their first meeting, the professor remarks: "Whether this individual was thirty-five or fifty years of age, I couldn't tell." He goes on to describe Nemo as a tall, self-contained man with a straight nose, broad brow, and wide-set eyes—"certainly the most wonderful physical specimen I'd ever met up with." In The Mysterious Island, the captain is in his late sixties and sports a long white beard.

He avoids dry land, except for desert islands and uninhabited regions such as Antarctica. In keeping with his contempt for surface civilization, he uses few commodities that aren't marine in origin, be they food, clothing, or even tobacco. As for his political views, he reveals an intense hatred of oppression, which he associates with the world's imperialistic nations. He therefore identifies himself with the Earth's oppressed, whether Ceylonese pearl divers, Cretans rising against the Turks, or even right whales attacked by sperm whales. When Professor Aronnax suggests that Nemo violates maritime and international law by sinking warships, Nemo responds that he does so in self-defense when attacked. He insists that terrestrial laws no longer apply to him, exclaiming in one scene:

Nemo is devoted to his crew and grieves deeply when members are killed after a mysterious collision with a surface vessel or during a giant squid attack in the Caribbean Sea. He is equally compassionate in his treatment of the castaways in The Mysterious Island, also retaining a deep attachment to his deceased wife and children. Despite these tragic losses, he rarely expresses his anger. Moreover, he is a man of immense courage, taking the lead in every emergency, from fighting sharks and squids to releasing the Nautilus from Antarctic ice—an ordeal that entailed reduced oxygen stores and consecutive eight-hour shifts. Aronnax also credits him with discovering Atlantis.

An innovative engineer, Nemo both designed and manufactured the Nautilus, including her electric propulsion units and navigational systems. Utilizing them with extraordinary skill, he navigated some of the ocean's most difficult underwater passages, such as those beneath the Antarctic ice barrier, as well as a fictitious tunnel under the Isthmus of Suez.

He has an exhaustive knowledge of marine biology, and it is his respect for Professor Aronnax's preeminence in the field that led to his befriending the professor once the latter was cast aboard the Nautilus. Further, Nemo is a polyglot, able to read all the books in the Nautilus vast library, regardless of their language. He demonstrates his linguistic ability in Twenty Thousand Leagues Under the Sea, when Arronax and two other character speak to him in French, English, German, and Latin and he understands all four languages. Other than this he also knows Indian languages Hindi, Kannada, Tamil, Telugu, and Malayalam, furthermore Greek among others. Nemo also invents a new language that he and his crew use to communicate with each other.

The captain has an exquisite taste in the fine arts, possessing many masterpieces of both painting and sculpture, from old masters to moderns. They are housed in the main lounge of the Nautilus along with Nemo's collection of pearls, corals, seashells, and other marine items, all gathered with his own hands. "No museum in Europe," Aronnax tells the captain, "has such a collection of exhibits." Yet, despite the opulence visible throughout the Nautilus, Nemo's stateroom was furnished with little more than a bed, a worktable, and the navigational instruments essential to the Nautilus. Even so, Captain Nemo claims to be extremely wealthy, boasting that "without the slightest trouble I could pay off the two-billion-dollar French national debt!"

Nemo later tells Aronnax that he will enclose his scientific findings and autobiography in a small unsinkable container: "The last one of us left on the Nautilus will throw that container into the sea, and it will drift wherever the waves take it."

Subsequently, a rather different container does wash ashore in The Mysterious Island, bearing tools, firearms, navigational instruments, an atlas, books, blank paper, and even clothing. They are found in a crate lashed to empty barrels, its contents sealed in a waterproof zinc envelope and showing careful preparation, and packing. Throughout the same book, Nemo repeatedly acts in this providential way, as when the sailor Pencroff pines for tobacco, then the young naturalist Harbert identifies some of the island's plant life.

Emblem 

Captain Nemo's emblem, as reproduced on the flag he raised when claiming the South Pole, is a large golden N on a black field. The motto of the Nautilus was Mobilis in mobili, a Latin phrase which Aronnax translates as "Moving within a moving element". It also has been rendered as "Moving within motion" and "Changing with change".

Origin 

In early drafts of Twenty Thousand Leagues Under the Seas, Nemo appears as a Polish noble, a member of the szlachta bent on avenging the murder of his family during Russia's violent suppression of the January Uprising. Verne's editor Pierre-Jules Hetzel feared that the book would offend the Russian Empire, a major French ally, and cause the book to be banned from that country's bookstores. Accordingly, Hetzel insisted that Verne revise the novel to conceal Nemo's background and political motivations.

Chronological discrepancies 

Twenty Thousand Leagues Under the Seas was first published in 1870 and reports the activities of the Nautilus over the years 1866 to 1868. The Mysterious Island was published in 1875 but is set in the years after the close of the American Civil War, i.e., 1865 to 1869. Described as an elderly man in his late sixties, Captain Nemo claims in its pages to have conducted his undersea travels some sixteen years earlier than the dates given in the prior novel.

It is true that the first French hardcover issue of Twenty Thousand Leagues Under the Seas (an octavo edition published in 1871 by Pierre-Jules Hetzel) contains minor errors that may have been perpetrated by its printers or even by Hetzel himself—who, at times, seems to have made edits without querying Verne. However the chronological discrepancies between this book and The Mysterious Island appear to have been present since its publication. They may have arisen from Hetzel's insistence that Verne drastically revise his original concept for the latter novel, in which, some scholars speculate, he had not initially planned to include Captain Nemo at all.

Portrayals 
In most subsequent media adaptations of 20,000 Leagues and Mysterious Island, Captain Nemo is depicted as a European, in accordance with the earlier of the two novels. Actors who have played him include:
 Allen Holubar in 20,000 Leagues Under the Sea (1916)
 Lionel Barrymore (as Count Andre Dakkar) in The Mysterious Island (1929)
 Leonard Penn in the Columbia film serial Mysterious Island (1951)
 Thomas Mitchell in the TV series Tales of Tomorrow (1952)
 James Mason in the Walt Disney film 20,000 Leagues Under the Sea (1954)
 Herbert Lom in Mysterious Island (1961)
 Julian Somers in the 8-part BBC Radio serial 20,000 Leagues Under The Sea (1961)
 Robert Ryan in Captain Nemo and the Underwater City (1969)
 Omar Sharif in La isla misteriosa y el capitán Nemo (1973)
 Len Carlson in the animated series The Undersea Adventures of Captain Nemo (1975)
 Vladislav Dvorzhetsky in the Soviet television miniseries Captain Nemo (1975)
 José Ferrer in the TV movie and short-lived TV series The Return of Captain Nemo (1978)
 Akio Otsuka in the anime series Nadia: The Secret of Blue Water (1990–1991)
 John Bach in the TV series Mysterious Island (1995)
 Michael Caine in the ABC-TV miniseries 20,000 Leagues Under the Sea (1997)
 Ben Cross in the NBC TV movie 20,000 Leagues Under the Sea (1997)
 Naseeruddin Shah in the film The League of Extraordinary Gentlemen (2003)
 Patrick Stewart in the TV movie Mysterious Island (2005)
 Sean Lawlor in the film 30,000 Leagues Under the Sea (2007)
 W. Morgan Sheppard in the film Mysterious Island (2012)
 Faran Tahir in the TV series Once Upon a Time (2016–2017)
 Sagar Arya in the BBC Radio adaptations of 20,000 Leagues Under The Sea and The Mysterious Island (2018)
Shazad Latif in the TV series Nautilus (TBA)

In popular culture
In the League of Extraordinary Gentlemen comic series by Alan Moore and Kevin O'Neill, Captain Nemo's Indian ancestry as Prince Dakkar is emphasized, yet his religious identity is left ambiguous between Hinduism and Sikhism. Journalist Shreya Ila Anasuya writes that Moore's Nemo is "nebulously portrayed as a Kali-worshipping man in a turban, never self-consciously Sikh." The title of "Nemo" is also later inherited by Prince Dakkar's headstrong daughter, Janni Dakkar, for the League of Extraordinary Gentlemen: Nemo Trilogy.

Nemo is the official file manager for the Cinnamon desktop environment; the name plays off of the Nautilus file manager from which it was forked.

A Polish singer - Bogdan Gajkowski - popular especially during the 1980s, started recording under the stage name "Kapitan Nemo".

In 1990, the group Dive released their debut single "Captain Nemo", based on Verne's character. This song was covered by Sarah Brightman on her 1993 album Dive.

The Japanese otome visual novel Code: Realize- Guardian of Rebirth features a scientist named Nemo. Nemo creates an airship named the Nautilus within the game. He considers the engineer Impey Barbicane, a reference to another Jules Verne novel, his ultimate scientific rival.

The Japanese mobile game Fate/Grand Order features a rider class servant named Captain Nemo. Nemo commands a magical submarine Nautilus through the Void Space.

In the novel “... no one” of Alberto Cavanna (original title “... nessuno”, Mursia, Italy, 2020), Nemo is John Digby, an admiral of the Royal Navy, appointed captain of the Nautilus by the dying builder.

Kevin J. Anderson wrote  Captain Nemo: The Fantastic History of a Dark Genius (2002), a fictional life of Captain Nemo.

In the 2006 graphic novel Captain Nemo by Jason DeAngelis (Seven Seas), set in an alternate timeline where Napoleon was never defeated at Waterloo but went on to found a dynasty whose descendants have conquered most of the world, Captain Nemo was, according to the French authorities, "slain and his accursed Nautilus sunk" in 1873, and twenty years later his son (who bears the same name as his father) leads his crew aboard the Nautilus II against the forces of Napoleon IV using the same tactics as his father, who is buried in a coral tomb, along with members of his crew, on the sunken island of Lemuria.

Daughter of the Deep, a 2021 novel by Rick Riordan, features two descendants of Captain Nemo as the protagonist and antagonist.

The animated series Space Strikers (known in French as 20 000 Lieues dans l'espace; translation: "20,000 Leagues in Space") stars a descendant of the original Captain Nemo, leading the crew of the spaceship Nautilus ina crusade to liberate Earth and other planets from the evil forces of Master Phantom.

Images

References

External links
 The Mysterious Island: The Secret of the Island: Chapter XVI . A summary of his life.
 Literary analysis of the novels of Jules Verne (In French)
 The origin of Captain Nemo: at Captainnemo's Home

America's Best Comics characters
Characters in written science fiction
Literary characters introduced in 1870
Fictional explorers
Fictional Indian people
Fictional mad scientists
Fictional pirates
Fictional princes
Fictional sailors
Fictional sea captains
Fictional undersea characters
Jules Verne characters
Twenty Thousand Leagues Under the Sea
Male characters in literature